"Cowgirl in the Sand" is a song written by Neil Young and first released on his 1969 album Everybody Knows This Is Nowhere.  Young has included live versions of the song on several albums and on the Crosby, Stills, Nash and Young album 4 Way Street.  It has also been covered by The Byrds on their self-titled album.  Like three other songs from Everybody Knows This Is Nowhere, "Cinnamon Girl", "Down by the River" and the title track, Young wrote "Cowgirl in the Sand" while he was suffering from the flu with a high fever at his home in Topanga, California.

Lyrics and music

The song's lyrics are about a promiscuous woman, or perhaps three different women if each stanza describes a different woman. Author Nigel Williamson describes the lyrics as "obscure and dreamlike, addressed to some idealized woman." Music critic Johnny Rogan describes the lyrics as "oblique", describing the woman as being both "idealistic" and "idealized" by the singer, referring particularly to the line "When so many love you, is it the same?" Author David Downing suggests that this line reflects ambiguity as to whether increased sexual freedom is a blessing or whether it is a curse. Downing, however, feels that the next line, "it's the woman in you that makes you want to play this game", was already outdated when the song was released in the late 1960s. At the time of the song's initial release, Rolling Stone described the lyrics as "quietly accusative". Young himself has claimed that "Cowgirl in the Sand" is about his impression of "beaches in Spain", despite the fact that when he wrote the song he had never been to Spain.

Author Ken Bielen suggests an interpretation of the lyrics, in which Young is singing about himself. The sand in the title could be a reference to young people coming to California, which has many beaches. The woman in the first stanza could be a veiled reference to Young, since Young moved from Canada to California. Lines such as "Old enough now to change your name" and "Has your band begun to rust" could be references to Young's departure from the band Buffalo Springfield. The line "When so many love you, is it the same?" could be a reflection of Young's own ambivalence towards fame, and in Bielen's interpretation, the line that bothered Downing, "it's the woman in you that makes you want to play this game", could be a reference to Young believing that his own feminine side is causing him to seek fame despite the harassment that fame attracts.

The music of "Cowgirl in the Sand", like that of "Down by the River", is based on a chord progression from minor chord to major chord. Also like "Down by the River", the song features several guitar solos featuring what critic Toby Creswell describes as "distortion and chaos". Young plays a distorted guitar section after each of the three choruses. Williamson claims that the song includes "some of the most powerful and untamed lead guitar playing ever recorded". Allmusic critic Matthew Greenwald describes Young's guitar playing as his "most barbed guitar excursions". Rogan notes, that it "has rightly been acclaimed as a prime example of Young's distinctive, brooding guitar work." However, when the song was first released, Rolling Stone, while noting that "the lead guitar, alternatively soaring, piercing and driving, keeps the song surging forward", considered Young's guitar work on this song "inferior" to that on earlier songs. Rolling Stone considered Young's vocal performance as "the real key to the success of this track", particularly praising the "depth" of his voice.

Young sings Cowgirl in the Sand primarily in the falsetto register.

Reception

Allmusic critic Matthew Greenwald described "Cowgirl in the Sand" as "one of Neil Young's most lasting compositions" and "a true classic". Rolling Stone critic Rob Sheffield calls it and "Down by the River" the "key tracks" on Everybody Knows This is Nowhere, calling them "long, violent guitar jams, rambling over the nine-minute mark with no trace of virtuosity at all, just staccato guitar blasts sounding as though Young is parachuting down into the middle of the Hatfield-McCoy feud."

Other appearances

Subsequent to its initial appearance on Everybody Knows This is Nowhere, "Cowgirl in the Sand" has been included on several Neil Young compilation albums, including Decade, Greatest Hits and The Archives Vol. 1 1963–1972. Live versions have been included on The Archives Vol. 1 1963–1972, Live at Massey Hall 1971, Live at the Fillmore East and Road Rock Vol. 1.

The Byrds covered "Cowgirl in the Sand" on their 1973 album Byrds.  The song has also been covered by The Magic Numbers, City and Colour and Josie Cotton, among others.  Cash Box said of the Byrds' version that the "spellbinding lyrics...are some of the prettiest ever."

References

1969 songs
Songs written by Neil Young
Neil Young songs
Song recordings produced by David Briggs (record producer)
The Byrds songs
Song recordings produced by Neil Young
Crazy Horse (band) songs